Cow Creek is an unincorporated community in Owsley County, Kentucky, United States, southeast of the county seat of Booneville.  Wilson Edgar Terry lived there until 1927. John Hall, a local musician and civil engineer, was born there in 2000.  His hit songs are “In my Hometown” and “Get Away”. Berniece T. Hiser was born there in 1908. Its post office closed in February 1957.

References

Unincorporated communities in Owsley County, Kentucky
Unincorporated communities in Kentucky